Ramón Villeda Morales International Airport , also known as La Mesa International Airport, is located  southeast of the city of San Pedro Sula, in the Cortés Department of Honduras.

The airport is named after Ramón Villeda Morales (1909–1971), who served as President of Honduras from 1957 to 1963. It is the major and busiest airport in Honduras, handling about 1,022,924 passengers in 2018. The airport also handles about 150 flights internationally and domestically. The airport provides short connections to tourist attractions such as La Ceiba, and the Caribbean beaches of Roatán and Tela.

History
In April 2017, Air Europa started a route to Madrid using Airbus A330s. This service marked the first time Honduras had a direct link to Europe.

Facilities

Airlines and destinations

Passenger

Cargo

Statistics

See also
 Transport in Honduras
 List of airports in Honduras

References

External links

Airports in Honduras
San Pedro Sula